John Kingsbury (died September 12, 1660) was an early resident of Watertown, Massachusetts and a founder of Dedham, Massachusetts. He represented Dedham in the Great and General Court in 1647.

Public service
Kingsbury was admitted as a freeman in Watertown on March 3, 1635/6 and settled in Dedham in 1636. He was one of the 12 men who petitioned the General Court to incorporate Dedham as a separate town, though they asked for it to be called Contentment.

He held various town offices in Dedham, including pound keeper. Kingsbury was a town proprietor and was elected to the very first board of selectmen in 1639. He served as selectman for 12 years in total. Kingsbury also signed the Town Covenant. He was appointed by the Massachusetts Bay Colony to end small causes.

After selecting John Allin as pastor of the First Church and Parish in Dedham, Kingsbury's name was put forth with those of Ralph Wheelock, John Hunting, and Thomas Carter, to be ruling elder, with Hunting eventually being selected. Some of the land he owned is in what is today Needham, Massachusetts

Personal life
Kingsbury was born in Boxford, Suffolk to John Kingsbury and traveled to Massachusetts with his older brother and sister-in-law in the early 1630s. He had a wife, Margarett.

Kingsbury had a brother, Joseph, also of Dedham.

References

Works cited

1660 deaths
Dedham, Massachusetts selectmen
Members of the colonial Massachusetts General Court from Dedham
People from Watertown, Massachusetts
Year of birth unknown
People from Needham, Massachusetts
Kingdom of England emigrants to Massachusetts Bay Colony
People from Boxford, Suffolk
Colonial American justices of the peace
People of colonial Massachusetts
Signers of the Dedham Covenant